Outlaws of the Range is a 1936 American Western film directed by Albert Herman. The film is also known as The Call of Justice in the United Kingdom.

Plot summary 
After rescuing Betty from a runaway horse, Steve (Bill Cody) is hired at her father's ranch. When rustlers go after Dad Wilson's cattle, Steve discovers their hideout and, in the ensuing fight, loses his gun. The crooks use Steve's gun to frame him for the murder of Dad Wilson.  Steve goes on the run, intent on uncovering the killer, and the brains behind the rustling ring.

Cast 
Bill Cody as Steve Harper
Marie Burton as Betty Wilson
William McCall as Dad Wilson
Gordon Griffith as Grant
Bill Cody Jr. as Jimmy Wilson
Wally West as Deputy Tom
Dick Strong as Mac - Bar X Foreman

Soundtrack

External links 

1936 films
1936 Western (genre) films
American black-and-white films
American Western (genre) films
Films directed by Albert Herman
1930s English-language films
1930s American films